André — sometimes transliterated as Andre — is the French and Portuguese form of the name Andrew, and is now also used in the English-speaking world. It used in France, Quebec, Canada and other French-speaking countries. It is a variation of the Greek name Andreas, a short form of any of various compound names derived from andr- 'man, warrior'.

The name is popular in Norway and Sweden.

Cognate names
Cognate names are:
 Bulgarian: Andrei, Andrey
 Breton : Andrev
 Canadian: André
 Catalan: Andreu
 Czech: Andrej, Ondřej
 Dutch: Andries
 English: Andrew, André
 Estonian: Andres, André/Andre
 Finnish: Antero
 French: André
 German: André/Andre, Andreas
 Hungarian: András, Endre
 Icelandic: Andri
 Indonesian: Andri
 Italian: Andrea
 Irish: Aindrias, Aindréas; Aindriú
 Japanese: アンデルー (Anderū), アンドレー (Andorē)
 Lithuanian: Andrius
 Lingala : André
 Latin : André
 Latvian: Andrejs
 Maltese: Indri 
 Norwegian: André/Andre, Anders
 Polish: Andrzej, Jędrzej
 Portuguese: André
 Romanian: Andrei
 Russian: Andrei, Andrey
 Scottish Gaelic: Aindrea, Anndra
 Serbo-Croatian: Andrija
 Slovenian: Andrej
 Spanish: Andrés
 Swedish: André/Andre
 Ukrainian: Andrii, Andriy
 Welsh: Andras

Given name
Notable people with this first name include:
André (footballer, born 1972) (André Luíz Alves Santos), Brazilian footballer
André (footballer, born 2001) (André Trindade da Costa Neto), Brazilian footballer
Andre Agassi, American tennis player
André Aleman, Dutch neuroscientist
Andre Anis, Estonian football player
Andre Anthony (born 1996), American football player
André-Marie Ampère, French physicist
Andre Baccellia (born 1997), American football player
André Bessette (1845–1937), Catholic Saint
André Béguin (1927–2021), Swiss war criminal and commandant of the World War II Wauwilermoos internment camp
André Benjamin, also known as André 3000, American musician, record producer and actor
André Bona, French footballer
André Breton, French writer and theorist
André Butzer, German painter
André Burakovsky, Swedish ice hockey player
Andre Carter, American National Football League (NFL) football player
Andre Castro (racing driver), American racing driver
André Cayatte, French filmmaker and lawyer
Andre Chachere (born 1996), American football player
André Chénier, French poet
Andre Cisco (born 2000), American football player
André Citroën, French inventor and engineer
André Cools, Belgian politician
André Frédéric Cournand, French physician and physiologist
Andre Dawson, American baseball player
Andre De Grasse, Canadian sprinter
André Derain, French painter
Andre Dillard, American National Football League (NFL) football player
André van Duin, Dutch comedian 
André van Duren (born 1958), Dutch film director
André Gagnon (1936–2020), Canadian composer and pianist
Andre Geim, Dutch-British physicist
André Gide, French writer
André de Gouveia, Portuguese humanist and pedagogue
André Grétry, French composer
Andre Gregory, French-born American writer, director and actor
André Greipel, German cyclist 
André Haefliger, Swiss mathematician
Andre Harrell (1960–2020), American record producer, songwriter, rapper (Dr. Jeckyll & Mr. Hyde), and founder of Uptown Records
Andre Hollins, American basketball player
Andre Iguodala, American basketball player
Andre James, American National Football League (NFL) football player
André Kuipers, Dutch astronaut 
André Kuper (born 1960), German politician 
André Lafargue (1917–2017), French journalist and theatre critic
André Lange, German bobsledder 
André Le Nôtre, French architect
André Lotterer, German-Belgian racing driver
Andre McCarter (born 1953), American basketball player
André Michel Lwoff, French biologist
André Malraux, French writer, art theorist, and Minister of Cultural Affairs
André Maurois, French writer
André Maranne, French-born British actor
André Masséna, French military commander in French Revolutionary and Napoleonic Wars
André Furtado de Mendonça, Portuguese governor of India
André Michelin, French industrialist who founded the Michelin Tyre Company 
Andre Miller, American basketball player
Andre Mintze (born 1998), American football player
André Moynet, French wartime fighter pilot and politician
André Myhrer, Swedish World Cup alpine ski racer and Olympic gold medalist
André Ooijer, Dutch football player
André Øvredal, Norwegian film director and screenwriter
Andre President, American National Football League (NFL) football player
André Previn (1929–2019), German-American jazz and classical pianist, conductor and composer
Andre Rampersad (born 1995), Trinidadian footballer
André de Resende, Portuguese Renaissance archaeologist
André Rebouças, Brazilian engineer and abolitionist
André F. Richard (1906–1993), Canadian politician and businessperson
André Rieu, Dutch violinist, orchestra conductor
Andre Russell, Jamaican and West Indies cricketer
Andre Romelle Young, American musician also known as Dr. Dre even though he is not a doctor
André Salvat (1920–2017), French Army colonel
André Seznec, French engineer
André Schubert, German football player and manager 
André Schürrle, German football player
Andre Smith (linebacker), American National Football League (NFL) football player
André Soares, Portuguese architect
André Sollie, Flemish author and illustrator of children's literature
André Spicer, New Zealand professor of organisational behaviour
Andre Spitzer, Israeli 1972 Summer Olympics fencing coach and victim of the Munich massacre
André Støylen, Norwegian politician for the Conservative Party
Andre Strode, American National Football League (NFL) football player
André Leon Talley (1948–2022), American fashion journalist
André the Giant (André Roussimoff), French wrestler and actor
André Thapedi, American lawyer and politician
Andre Tippett, American National Football League (NFL) football player
André Travetto, French footballer
André Villas-Boas, Portuguese football manager
Andre Wisdom, British football player
Andre Woolridge (born 1973), American basketball player
Andre Young, better known as Dr. Dre, American rapper and producer
André Verbart, Dutch poet
André Zwoboda, French screenwriter, film director and producer

Surname
 Benjamin André (1990), French footballer
 Fabienne André (1996), born  British wheelchair racer
 John André (1750 – 1780), British army officer (American war of independence)
 Mark Andre (1964), French composer

Fictional characters
 André, a character in the 1984 short film The Adventures of André & Wally B.
 André, the main antagonist of the Ubisoft video game Rayman 3: Hoodlum Havoc
 André, in the 2016 film A Wedding

 Andre the blacksmith from the 3rd installment of the Fromsoft gaming series DarkSouls 3

 André Baptiste Sr., a character from the 2005 film Lord of War
 André-Baptiste Depérinconu, a character from the Belgian comic strip Le Petit Spirou
 André Bishop, the main protagonist of the Electronic Arts video game Fight Night Champion
 André Bourgeois, a character in the animated series Miraculous: Tales of Ladybug & Cat Noir
 André Camel, a fictitious FBI agent in the manga series Case Closed
 André de France, the eponymous hero from the Old French romance from the 12th century
 André Delambre, a character in the 1958 film The Fly, which was based on the namesake short story
André DiMera, a fictional serial killer from the American soap opera Days of Our Lives
 André Grandier, one of the main characters of the manga series The Rose of Versailles
 André Harris, a character from the Nickelodeon TV series Victorious
 André Jurieux, a character in the 1939 film The Rules of the Game
André LeBlanc (DC Comics), a supervillain who appears in American comic books published by DC Comics
Andre Lee, a Korean-American biochemist in the American science fiction series Inside Job
Andre Lyon, a character in the American musical drama Empire
André Micheaux, best known as Michael Vaughn, a character in the television series Alias
 André Toulon, a character in the film series Puppet Master

Other uses
André (film), a 1994 film about André the seal
André (play), a 1798 play by William Dunlap
André the Seal

See also
Jean-André
Sister/Sœur André

References

French masculine given names
Given names of Greek language origin